Union County is a county located in the U.S. state of Illinois. According to the 2020 United States Census, it had a population of 17,244. Its county seat is Jonesboro. It is located in the southern portion of Illinois known locally as "Little Egypt".

History
Union County was formed out of Johnson County, nearly a year before the Illinois Territory gained statehood. It was named for a joint revival meeting of the Baptists and Dunkards, called a "union meeting". The county seal depicts the leaders of these two groups shaking hands.

Geography

Climate and weather

Major highways

  Interstate 57
  U.S. Highway 51
  Illinois Route 3
  Illinois Route 127
  Illinois Route 146

Adjacent counties

 Jackson County – north
 Williamson County – northeast
 Johnson County – east
 Pulaski County – southeast
 Alexander County – south
 Cape Girardeau County, Missouri – west
 Perry County, Missouri – northwest

Protected areas

 Brown Barrens Nature Preserve
 Crab Orchard National Wildlife Refuge (partial)
 Cypress Creek National Wildlife Refuge (partial)
 Lincoln Memorial Picnic Grounds
 Giant City State Park (partial)
 McClure Shale Glade Nature Preserve
 Trail of Tears State Forest
 Shawnee National Forest (partial)
 Union County State Fish and Wildlife Area

Demographics

As of the 2010 United States Census, there were 17,808 people, 7,167 households, and 4,837 families residing in the county. The racial makeup of the county was 94.8% white, 0.9% black or African American, 0.5% American Indian, 0.3% Asian, 2.0% from other races, and 1.5% from two or more races. Those of Hispanic or Latino origin made up 4.8% of the population. In terms of ancestry, 23.0% were German, 12.6% were Irish, 9.4% were English, and 8.1% were American.

Of the 7,167 households, 29.7% had children under the age of 18 living with them, 52.6% were married couples living together, 10.6% had a female householder with no husband present, 32.5% were non-families, and 28.4% of all households were made up of individuals. The average household size was 2.41 and the average family size was 2.92. The median age was 42.9 years.

The median income for a household in the county was $39,760 and the median income for a family was $48,465. Males had a median income of $36,831 versus $31,272 for females. The per capita income for the county was $19,512. About 12.7% of families and 21.1% of the population were below the poverty line, including 22.5% of those under age 18 and 16.7% of those age 65 or over.

Communities

Cities
 Anna
 Jonesboro (seat)

Villages

 Alto Pass
 Cobden
 Dongola
 Mill Creek

Unincorporated communities

 Balcom
 La Rue
 Reynoldsville
 Ware
 Wolf Lake

Politics
Like much of Southern Illinois, Union County has shifted toward the Republican Party over the past couple decades, with the Republican candidate for president winning the county since 2000.

Education
School districts include:

K-12:

 Cobden School Unit District 17
 Dongola School Unit District 66
 Goreville Community Unit School District 1
 Shawnee Community Unit School District 84

Secondary:
 Anna Jonesboro Community High School District 81
 Vienna High School District 133

Elementary:

 Anna Community Consolidated School District 37
 Buncombe Consolidated School District 43
 Cypress School District 64
 Jonesboro Community Consolidated School District 43
 Lick Creek Community Consolidated School District 16

See also
 National Register of Historic Places listings in Union County, Illinois
 Ku Klux Klan in Southern Illinois

References

Bibliography

External links
 Union County Official Website
 Union County State's Attorney
 Union County Treasurer
 Union County Chamber of Commerce

 
1818 establishments in Illinois Territory
Illinois counties
Illinois counties on the Mississippi River
Southern Illinois
Pre-statehood history of Illinois
Populated places established in 1818